Tom Taylor (25 May 1878 – 16 March 1960) was an English amateur first-class cricketer, who played for Yorkshire during its successful period under Lord Hawke between 1900 and 1902. Taylor was a noted amateur batsman, who retired early as he needed to devote his time to his engineering business after the 1902 season.

It is likely that Taylor would have received England honours had he been able to keep up the game, for he was chosen as 12th man in the rain-ruined Lord's Test match in 1902. Taylor was a fleet-footed and extremely sound middle order batsman, who was especially strong against slow bowling on the many difficult pitches experienced in Yorkshire. Against fast bowling he was not as certain.

Life and career
Tom Launcelot Taylor was born in Headingley, Leeds, Yorkshire, England.

Taylor began his career as a batsman and wicket-keeper for Uppingham School and his 100 not out against Repton in 1896 gave him a reputation as the best public school batsman in England at the time – a claim amply justified by his average of 84 that year. The following year he went up to Trinity College, Cambridge. Although he played only one match for Cambridge University in 1898, the following year he played regularly, but was disappointing considering his school reputation and was played for his wicket-keeping, which was never required when he joined Yorkshire.

It was his century against the Australians in 1899 that made critics note Taylor's talent, and the following year, in his last year at University, he did so well for Yorkshire that he was named as a Cricketer of the Year by Wisden, reaching 1,000 runs for the first time and playing for The Gentlemen at North Marine Road Ground, Scarborough. The following year, Taylor established himself as one of Yorkshire's best batsmen, with 44 on a treacherous wicket at Leyton Cricket Ground (where no other batsman reached 15) showing him one of the best batsmen on a bad wicket.

In 1902, Taylor batted so well on a succession of difficult pitches that he scored 1,567 runs, including a century for the Gentlemen at Scarborough, and superb innings against Derbyshire and Leicestershire on soft pitches. He was Yorkshire's leading batsman that season, and it came as a shock when, after brief tours of Australia and New Zealand that winter, Taylor stayed in Japan during 1903. Yorkshire's batting in that summer really showed what Taylor meant to them on soft or treacherous pitches, and, when he returned to England in 1904, he devoted so much time to his engineering business that he could never spare any time for three-day cricket apart from July and August 1906. His lack of practice clearly showed in thirteen matches played in those months: his average was a modest 21.00 and he only twice reached fifty. Yet, there is little doubt Taylor would still have been of value to Yorkshire could he have spared some time for cricket, especially in wet summers.

In 1927, Taylor was granted life membership by the Yorkshire club along with Stanley Jackson. In 1947, Taylor succeeded Jackson as President of Yorkshire County Cricket Club, and held office till his death in Leeds in 1960. Besides his cricketing ability, Taylor also played tennis and field hockey.

Bibliography

References

External links
 First-class batting record

1878 births
1960 deaths
People educated at Uppingham School
Alumni of Trinity College, Cambridge
Cambridge University cricketers
Wisden Cricketers of the Year
Yorkshire cricketers
People from Headingley
English cricketers
Gentlemen cricketers
Marylebone Cricket Club cricketers
Presidents of Yorkshire County Cricket Club
Lord Hawke's XI cricketers
C. I. Thornton's XI cricketers
Over 30s v Under 30s cricketers
W. G. Grace's XI cricketers